Sleep is a 2013 film directed by Juha Lilja consisting of approximately 1 hour long takes about Lilja himself sleeping naked. Multiple camera angles are used, and film also contains dream sequences, which are shot on a drone and a motorcycle. The Film premiered at International Film Festival Rotterdam in 2015 as a part of its Signals 24/7 theme, which was focusing on how the attention economy and technological improvements have changed society. Other films from the director have been screened in festivals in Asia and USA.

The film was released 50 years after the release of Sleep from American artist and filmmaker Andy Warhol. The 2013 remake explores how modern technology has made it easier for anyone to produce such monumental length films. Warhol had originally planned Sleep to be an 8-hour film. According to his memoirs, he had said to Gerard Malanga: "Wouldn't it be fabulous to film Brigitte Bardot sleeping for eight hours" Because of technical difficulties it was not possible at the time. Lilja's version was made to reach the 8 hour goal.

In 2023, 10 years, after its release, the movie got unexpected traction after being associated with the sleepstreaming phenomenon. In a couple of days it gained more than 100 000 new views in YouTube. On March 8, 2023, Juha Lilja informed in his YouTube channel, that YouTube has removed the video because of violation of sex and nudity policy. This policy states, that nudity may be allowed when the purpose is educational, documentary, scientific, or artistic, and it isn’t gratuitous. In his video about the event, Juha Lilja stated that he is sad because the decision means that YouTube thinks Sleep is not art.

See also
List of longest films by running time

References

External links
 
 
 Sleep on director's web page

2013 films
Swedish documentary films
2010s avant-garde and experimental films
Films without speech
2010s Swedish films